The Millbrook Steamboat & Trading Company was a ferry operator on the River Tamar between Devon and Cornwall in England. It was started in 1894, and initially operated a ferry route from Millbrook in Cornwall to Plymouth.  It expanded, and eventually became the largest river boat operator in the Plymouth area.  From 1943 it operated the Cremyll Ferry.

The company also operated bus services on the Rame Peninsula in Cornwall. The bus services were eventually taken over by Western National.

In 1980 the company was sold to Dart Pleasure Craft.  In 1985 the new owners pulled out of operations in the Plymouth area, and the company closed.

Fleet List

References

External links 
Millbrook Steamship Company on Simplon website

River Tamar
Ferry companies of England
Water transport in Cornwall
Water transport in Devon
Companies based in Cornwall
Former bus operators in Cornwall
Defunct ferry companies of the United Kingdom